Mustafa Lleshi was an Albanian anti-fascist hero of World War II.

Mustafa Lleshi Street, a street in Tirana, the capital of Albania, is named in his honor.

References

Albanian people of World War II
Year of birth missing
Year of death missing
Albanian anti-fascists